Gibberula nebulosa is a species of very small sea snail, a marine gastropod mollusk or micromollusk in the family Cystiscidae.

Description
The length of the shell attains 6.05 mm.

Distribution
This marine species occurs off New Caledonia.

References

External links

nebulosa
Gastropods described in 2002